Kyauk Kyauk Kyauk 2: Journey to the Death is a 2019 Burmese horror comedy film, directed by Aww Ratha starring Nay Toe, Nan Su Oo, Htun Htun, May Myint Mo, Tyron Bejay, Joker and Pyae Pyae. This is the sequel movie of Kyauk Kyauk Kyauk And Second Installment Of film series. The film, produced by 7th Sense Film Production premiered in Myanmar on December 26, 2019.

Cast
Nay Toe as That Ti
Nan Su Oo as Kalyar
Htun Htun as Min Aung
May Myint Mo as Pont Pont
Tyron Bejay as Tyron
Joker as Bala
Pyae Pyae as Pyae Pyae

References

2019 films
2010s Burmese-language films
2019 comedy horror films
Films shot in Myanmar
Burmese comedy horror films